Arnold Bernid "Casey" Jones is a fictional character that appears in Teenage Mutant Ninja Turtles comics and related media. Created by Kevin Eastman and Peter Laird, he first appeared in the one-shot, Raphael: Teenage Mutant Ninja Turtle (April 1985). Like the turtles, Casey Jones is a vigilante, and was created as a parody of vigilante characters that were popular in comics at the time. Casey usually has long dark hair, wears an ice hockey mask and cut-off biking gloves, and carries his weapons in a golf bag over his shoulder.

His weapons include various sports equipment, such as baseball bats, ice hockey sticks, golf clubs, cricket bats, and tennis rackets. He becomes a love interest of April O'Neil.

The character has been featured in various adaptations, and has been portrayed by several actors. He was first voiced by Pat Fraley in the 1987 series, Marc Thompson in the 2003 series, Chris Evans in the 2007 film, Josh Peck in the 2012 series, Zelda Williams as a female version in the 2018 series, Haley Joel Osment in a film adaptation of the 2018 series, and has been portrayed in live action by Elias Koteas in the 1990 and 1993 films and by Stephen Amell in the 2016 film.

Comic books

Mirage Studios 

In the original Mirage series, Casey first appeared in the Raphael one-shot, by Kevin Eastman and Peter Laird. Casey was introduced as a violent, hot-tempered vigilante whose anger concerned even Raphael. The turtle stopped Casey from killing some muggers, causing an initial conflict between the two. This clash was quickly resolved, and Casey and Raphael became fast friends. Later, Casey came to the turtles' aid when they are attacked by the Shredder in April O'Neil's home. The vigilante even took the turtles to his grandmother's old farmhouse in Northampton, cementing his place with the group.

In the Mirage series, Casey is extremely violent, even more so than Raphael, but he mellows throughout the course of the series. In Shades of Gray, Casey accidentally kills a teenager who tried to mug him. The incident sent him into a drunken spiral, damaging his relationship with April O'Neil. His initial homicidal tendencies are especially present in his first appearance, although he never actually murders anyone in that instance.

During the three-part episode City at War, Casey leaves the farmhouse and begins to drive to Los Angeles, planning to find April, but instead meets a pregnant woman named Gabrielle with whom he falls in love and marries.  Gabrielle dies during childbirth and Casey is left to take care of her daughter, whom he names Shadow.  After spreading Gabrielle's ashes, Casey returns to New York with Shadow to stay with his mother. In a chance encounter, Casey is reunited with April when she comes to buy the apartment building owned by Casey's mother. During this meeting it is revealed that Casey's real name is Arnold but prefers to use his middle name only.

Casey repairs his relationship with April and they begin dating. By volume four, he and April are married, raising Shadow as their daughter and trying to have a child of their own. April eventually leaves Casey and Shadow when she learns that she is not human and is a product of the Kirby warp pen. As April comes to terms within herself in Alaska, Casey takes to the nightclubs to drown his sorrows. He meets up with the Foot Clan leader Karai at one of these clubs and, after a few drinks, awakens at Karai's retreat with no memory of the night before, although Karai knows something of what had happened. This plotline was left unresolved as the fourth volume came to an abrupt end.

Archie Comics 
Although mentioned, Casey Jones never appears in the Archie Comics Teenage Mutant Ninja Turtles Adventures.

Dreamwave Productions 
The fourth issue of the Dreamwave Productions series (based on the 2003 animated series) focused entirely on Casey Jones. When Casey was a little kid, he was worried that his dad should give into the Purple Dragons and their protection racket, lest something bad happen. Mr. Jones becomes violent and tells Casey that he is playing on his team and that a Jones never gives in (nearly punching Casey in a violent rage). Mr. Jones hears something and figures it is the Purple Dragons breaking into his store. Casey watches as his father's store burns to the ground. The Purple Dragon leader, Hun, then smacks Casey aside with the encouragement that his father pay up. Casey breaks a bottle and stabs Hun in the leg with it. Furious, Hun has his thugs beat Casey to a pulp. Before being thrown out of the hospital because he lacked insurance, Casey is diagnosed with brain damage from the beating. Shortly after that, Mr. Jones goes searching for Hun to get revenge and vanishes. Casey's mom then goes searching for her husband and vanishes, too. Casey drifts off into a delusional state, reassuring himself that his father and mother are still alive, just waiting for Casey to clean the streets of all the Purple Dragons before they can return.

IDW Comics 
In the TMNT series released by IDW Publishing, Casey is a young college scholarship holder. Upon his mother's death by cancer, his father became an alcoholic thug who would vent his daily frustration on his son. On one such occasion, Casey was saved from another violent beating by Raphael, who had at that time lived a solitary life as a street vagrant following his mutation (unaware that he had a family searching for him), and the two quickly became fast friends and fellow vigilantes until Raphael was reunited with his family, at which point Casey was introduced to and befriended the other three turtles as well.

Television

1987 TMNT animated series
In the 1987 animated series, Casey Jones is a crazed vigilante with a "Dirty Harry" like persona, who goes after all sorts of criminals, from robbers to litterers.  He never takes off his mask on screen, even when once going undercover in a business suit.

Appearing in only five episodes of the series, this version of Casey does not play a role as central as his comic book counterpart: He does not have a friendship with Raphael, nor a relationship with April – he does not even encounter her until season 5's Leonardo Cuts Loose, though later they do team up in episodes Night of the Rogues and Cyber-Turtles. Casey was voiced by Pat Fraley. In the Japanese version, he was voiced by Issei Futamata and Akio Ōtsuka (NHK-BS2 Version).

2003 TMNT animated series
In the 2003 animated series, Jones has a much more important role. He speaks in a Brooklyn accent, voiced by Marc Thompson in English and Tokuyoshi Kawashima in Japanese. This incarnation's personality is on par with Raphael's. Raphael first meets Casey while the vigilante tries to stop a mugging by the Purple Dragons. Seeing a lot of himself in Casey, Raphael tries to reason with him and prevent him from letting his anger get the best of him (Raphael himself had just almost severely injured Michelangelo and was overwhelmed by guilt). Though initially uninterested in what he has to say, Casey eventually bonds with Raphael after he loses to Raph in a bike race and begins listening to his lessons. Casey, Raphael, and the other turtles proceed to team up and defeat a gang of Purple Dragons. From this point on, Casey becomes a valuable ally of the Turtles, and has a closer friendship with Raphael than in any other incarnation.

Casey's backstory is fleshed out over the course of the series. When he was a child, his father's shop was burned down by Hun and the Purple Dragons for being denied protection money. Despite being threatened not to, his father (Arnold Casey Jones Sr.) later went to the police over it. It is implied that he was killed for doing so. This gave Casey his hatred for crime and an essential lifelong vendetta against the Purple Dragons. This backstory was later expanded upon in the Dreamwave comics and adopted into the Mirage series.

It is revealed in episode "The Lesson" that he and the Turtles had met when they were kids, although neither the Turtles nor Casey are aware of the truth. During a trip to the surface, the young Turtles witness bullies picking on young "Arnie". Disguising themselves as a human child, they attempt to teach him self-defense. However, their unique perspectives and attitudes resulted in more trouble than help. In the end, however, young Casey angrily jumps to the defense of a friend against the bullies, proclaiming they were no match for "Arnold Casey Jones!" In a bit of foreshadowing, he uses a bully's hockey stick against them.

His main catchphrase is the battle cry "Goongala!". It is also revealed in "The Lesson" that this came from a young Casey being unable to pronounce "gorogoro-sama", a battle cry literally meaning "Mr. Thunder", that young Michelangelo kept trying to teach him. "Goongala" was the best he could come up with.

Despite his lack of intelligence and apparent incompetence, he was early on in the series referred to by Hun as "Our (the Purple Dragon's) greatest enemy", and a fighting tournament was held to see which Dragon would have the honor of killing him, indicating how serious a threat the criminal underworld views him as.

In the series, Casey has a good heart, but is easily enraged and occasionally bumbling. He loves motorcycles. In a symbolic way, he sees the Turtles as the little brothers he never had. As such, he often comes to their aid against the Shredder, the Foot Clan, or other enemies.

Early on, Casey meets April and there is an initial attraction. However, their conflicting personalities lead to frequent arguments at first. Over time, however, they start dating and a serious relationship develops. In the Back to the Sewers (seventh) season, Casey proposes marriage to her. In the finale "Wedding Bells and Bytes", they are married, with Raphael serving as the best man and Michelangelo as the maid of honor. Many recurring characters were in attendance and the ceremony performed by the Fugitoid. In the Fast Forward (sixth) season, the Turtles and Splinter are transported to 2105, where they meet April and Casey's great grandson, Cody Jones, the heir to O'Neil Tech, a company created by April, Casey and Donatello after the turtles return to their own time. One of Cody's inventions, the Turtle X armor, resembles Casey's hockey mask.

2012 TMNT animated series

Casey Jones appeared for the first time in the second season of the 2012 animated series. In the tie-in prequel comic on the official website, Raphael spots some graffiti on a sewer wall that says, "Jones is everywhere!", which also had his iconic hockey mask painted beside it. In a new trailer from IGN, it is shown that Casey thinks he is the "Last Hope" for New York City. He seems to know about mutants, which is seen when he rescues April from Mutagen Man and is shown to be able to defeat him on his own. 
An interview with show creator Ciro Nieli on IGN elaborates: 
I asked about Casey Jones on the series, and Nieli replied, "Casey Jones will show up in the second season," noting he did not want to give too much away, but that, "We'll take our time introducing him." Casey will also be a high school student, but "Maybe a couple years older – he got held back."
He is voiced by Josh Peck.
He is introduced in the episode "Mutagen Man Unleashed" as a hockey player who April tutors in school.

He later becomes a vigilante who hunts criminals, mutants and anything that he thinks threatens "his" city in season two's episode "The Good, The Bad and Casey Jones" and becomes an ally to the turtles, specifically Raphael who becomes his best friend. He also has rivalry with Donatello due to their mutual feelings for April. Casey also has a penchant for speaking in third-person and has a fear of rats, which includes Splinter to an extent.

As the series progresses, his rivalry with Donatello is lessened, and he becomes closer to the whole team in general. In season three's "Casey Jones VS. The Underworld" Casey decides to start hunting crime on his own and eventually meets his new own archenemy, Hun, the new leader of the Purple Dragons. He is defeated, at first, but later defeats Hun and prolongs Shredder's plans. He is later one of only six inhabitants of Earth-the others being April and the Turtles-to be rescued before the planet is consumed by an artificial black hole.

In the Season 4 finale, "Owari" Casey assists the Turtles in avenging the death of Splinter. When the Turtles gear up for a mission, Casey gets a new mask that bears a strong resemblance to his comic counterpart.

In the alternate future seen in Raphael: Mutant Apocalypse, Casey was one of the many humans that died as a result of a giant Mutagen bomb hitting the planet. Raphael kept his skull and helmet, which was attached to a bomb that he used to take down Maximus Kong's vehicle.

In the Monstrous Tales saga, Casey turns into a vampire, along with April, Donatello and Raphael, until he returns to normal, due to Mikey defeating Dracula.

In the Crossover Tales saga, Casey assists the Turtles and their 1980s counterparts in stopping Krang and the 1980s counterpart of the Shredder. He and April enlists Karai and Shinigami to hunt down Bebop and Rocksteady in "The Foot Walks Again". Later, Casey teams up with the Turtles and the Mighty Mutanimals to put an end to Zeck and Steranko in "The Big Blowout".

Rise of the Teenage Mutant Ninja Turtles

In Rise of the Teenage Mutant Ninja Turtles, the series introduced a female incarnation of the character named Cassandra "Casey" Jones who is voiced by Zelda Williams. Before her identity was revealed, she was originally known as the Foot Recruit of the Foot Clan who debuted in "Hot Soup: The Game."

By the four part episode "Finale," Shredder regained his power of speech and made the Foot Recruit his new general after the Foot Lieutenant and the Foot Brute were trapped upon the collapse of Baron Draxum's laboratory. When at the Crying Titan, Shredder had the Foot Recruit prepare the ritual where it combined with the Empyrean within the Crying Titan which would enable him to drain Splinter's essence. During the Turtles and April's fight with Shredder, Casey defected to their side and helped them, Baron Draxum, and the spirits of the Hamato Clan's ancestors defeat the Shredder while returning Oroku Saki's spirit to them.

A second, more traditional version of Casey appears in Rise of the Teenage Mutant Ninja Turtles: The Movie, voiced by Haley Joel Osment. This Casey hails from the year 2044, and travels back in time to warn the Turtles of an impending alien invasion by the Krang, helping them defeat the aliens after the invasion begins. After the Krang's defeat, it is revealed that Cassandra was also fighting the invaders on her own, and Casey reveals that he is her son.

Feature films
Casey Jones has lead roles in four of the six Teenage Mutant Ninja Turtles films. In the first film, he is portrayed by Elias Koteas. He is a former professional ice hockey player who had turned vigilante after his career ended early due to an injury. He encounters Raphael while attacking some purse-snatchers. Raphael stops Casey from harming the thieves, whereupon Casey turns his aggression on Raphael.

Casey later sees Raphael alone on a rooftop surrounded by Foot soldiers and comes to the Turtles' aid in the subsequent attack.  He is referred to by Michelangelo as "Wayne Gretzky on steroids." Casey Jones joins the Turtles to assist them against the Shredder and the Foot, mentions to April that he was a professional ice hockey player until he got injured, and ultimately rescues Splinter from the Foot's headquarters and crushes the Shredder in a garbage truck.  He also falls in love with April in the process.

In the third film, Casey (once again portrayed by Elias Koteas) returns at the Turtles' request to assist Splinter in watching over the four honor guards that were transported to the present when the Turtles would take their place in feudal Japan. Koteas also appears as an ancestor of Jones named Whit who, like his descendant, ends up helping the Turtles despite anti-heroic tendencies. He also shows a romantic interest in April, as Casey does. It is implied that Casey had gone away for a while, explaining his absence in the second film.

Casey appears in the 2007 TMNT film, and is voiced by Chris Evans. By the time the film takes place, Casey is now in a relationship with April and he works for her shipping company as a delivery man, spending his nights continuing his vigilante activities. Through this, he meets Raphael as the Nightwatcher, becoming his sidekick - though he claims Raphael is the sidekick. At the beginning of the film, he is the only character to know that Raphael is the Nightwatcher. When he meets Raphael in costume, the latter is at first confused as to how he was able to figure it out, where Casey responds, "Wasn't that hard, man. Y'know, you look like a big metal turtle," and Raphael says, rather despondently, "It's that obvious, huh?"

Jones appears in Teenage Mutant Ninja Turtles: Out of the Shadows, the sequel to the 2014 film, played by Stephen Amell. Here, Jones is portrayed as a hot-headed prison guard who dreams of being a NYC Detective. After the Shredder escapes from custody and Bebop and Rocksteady beat him up and steal his armored vehicle Casey decides to hunt the two criminals on his own. Tracking them to the TCRI building, Jones notices April being pursued by the Foot and grabs from his trunk his hockey stick and mask, which he uses to fight the Foot Clan. He is quickly introduced to the turtles and becomes a butt of their jokes, with Raph and Mikey mocking his hockey mask and later tricking him into attacking Master Splinter (which results in Casey getting easily defeated). However, within a day Raph and Mikey warm up to Casey and convince him to help them steal the Purple Ooze from police headquarters. When the turtles are threatened by the police Casey and April place themselves in the line of fire to buy the turtles time to escape. Later, after Casey and April are freed, Casey assists in the final battle by taking on Bebop and Rocksteady. He makes a pair of homemade roller blades and uses a lead pipe like a hockey stick to defeat them. This Casey is shown to be a good man who only fights crime on his own when he feels like he has no choice. He does not use a wide array of weapons, opting for just his hockey stick and later a lead pipe. The film ends with Casey and April arranging to go on a date.

Video games
Casey Jones is a playable character in the NES and Sega Genesis versions of Teenage Mutant Ninja Turtles: Tournament Fighters, and he also appears in the background in Donatello's stage in the SNES version.
In Teenage Mutant Ninja Turtles: The Manhattan Missions he rescues the Turtles if they lose all their health.
Casey Jones is in the 2003 video game and the 2003 Game Boy Advance game Teenage Mutant Ninja Turtles. He is a boss in Raph's story mode and becomes playable in story mode if Raphael defeats Level 1.
He is an unlockable alternate for Raphael in Teenage Mutant Ninja Turtles 2: Battle Nexus.
He also appears in the game Teenage Mutant Ninja Turtles 3: Mutant Nightmare and the app TMNT Legends.
He is a playable character in Teenage Mutant Ninja Turtles: Mutant Melee, the Wii/PS2 fighting game Teenage Mutant Ninja Turtles: Smash-Up, and Teenage Mutant Ninja Turtles: Shredder's Revenge.
He is an unlockable character in Teenage Mutant Ninja Turtles: Shredder's Revenge’ and appears in the ending cutscene. He is unlockable after defeating Super Shredder.

References

External links
Read the comic that introduced Casey Jones at the Official Mirage Group site

Teenage Mutant Ninja Turtles characters
Fictional characters from New York City
Fictional ice hockey players
Fictional clubfighters
Fictional stick-fighters
Comics characters introduced in 1985
Male characters in comics
Vigilante characters in comics